The Cunningham Bridge is an historic place on the national register in Adams County, Pennsylvania, near Greenmount, Pennsylvania, United States. The three-section iron bridge spans west-to-east from Franklin Township to Cumberland Township and is the oldest example of a Baltimore truss.  It was listed on the National Register of Historic Places as "Bridge in Cumberland Township" in 1988 despite being in Franklin Township, Adams County, Pennsylvania.

Chronology
1894 — The Pittsburgh Bridge Company (Nelson & Buchanon Engrs. & Contrs, agents) built the bridge 0.5 mile west of the Greenmount.
1986 — A $138,512 upgrade began for the bridge.
1990 — The bridge was closed indefinitely.
1996 — After having been struck by a motorist in the Spring, the Cunningham Bridge survived a 500 year flood on June 19 that washed away the wooden Sachs Covered Bridge (upstream) and the iron 1886 Rothhaupt Bridge (downstream).
1997 — A 1997 Pennsylvania Department of Transportation (PennDOT) study recommended replacing the entire bridge, and the Adams County Citizens Alliance held a meeting on April 8 regarding the bridge.
2000 — PennDOT planned to demolish the Cunningham Bridge.
2002 — A resolution by the county commissioners was for "every effort should be made to keep the bridge at its current location [and] preserve as much historic detail as possible."
2011 — The bridge was slated for demolition in 2011.

See also
National Register of Historic Places listings in Adams County, Pennsylvania

References

Bridges completed in 1894
Bridges in Adams County, Pennsylvania
Road bridges on the National Register of Historic Places in Pennsylvania
Truss bridges in the United States
National Register of Historic Places in Adams County, Pennsylvania
1894 establishments in Pennsylvania
Baltimore truss bridges